Humbertson Wright (1876 in London, England, UK – 1953), sometimes credited as Humberstone Wright or Humberston H. Wright, was a British film actor.

Filmography

 Trapped by the London Sharks (1916)
 Thelma (1918)
 The Secret Woman (1918)
 The Romance of Lady Hamilton (1919)
 The Rocks of Valpre (1919)
 The Double Life of Mr. Alfred Burton (1919)
 God's Clay (1919)
 The Garden of Resurrection (1919)
 The Little Welsh Girl (1920)
 Walls of Prejudice (1920)
 The Way of the World (1920)
 Uncle Dick's Darling (1920)
 The English Rose (1920)
 The Fifth Form at St. Dominic's (1921)
 The Glorious Adventure (1922)
 The Peacemaker (1922)
 A Sporting Double (1922)
 Creation (1922)
 Fu Manchu (1923)
 The Sign of Four (1923)
 Sally Bishop (1924)
 In the Blood (1923)
 Henry, King of Navarre (1924)
 Slaves of Destiny (1924)
 The Gay Corinthian (1924)
 The Love Story of Aliette Brunton (1924)
 The Squire of Long Hadley (1925)
 The Flag Lieutenant (1926)
 London Love (1926)
 Safety First (1926)
 Mademoiselle from Armentieres (1926)
 Hindle Wakes (1927)
 Roses of Picardy (1927)
 A Sister to Assist 'Er (1927)
 The Flight Commander (1927)
 The Arcadians (1927)
 The Glad Eye (1927)
 The Physician (1928)
 Boadicea (1928)
 What Money Can Buy (1928)
 Mademoiselle Parley Voo (1928)
 Sailors Don't Care (1928)
 Master and Man (1929)
 High Treason (1929)
 Waterloo (1929)
 White Cargo (1929)
 Alf's Button (1930)
 Down River (1931)
 The Marriage Bond (1932)
 Lloyd of the C.I.D. (1932)
 Congress Dances (1932)
 In a Monastery Garden (1932)
 Commissionaire (1933)
 The House of Trent (1933)
 Strictly Illegal (1935)
 Young and Innocent (1937)
 Escape Dangerous (1947)

References

External links

1870s births
1953 deaths
Male actors from London
English male film actors
English male silent film actors
20th-century English male actors